Trudeau is a surname. Notable people with the surname include:
Trudeau family, a notable Canadian family known in politics, business and film, including: 
Charles-Émile Trudeau (1887–1935), Canadian businessman and father of Pierre Trudeau
Pierre Trudeau (1919–2000), Prime Minister of Canada 1968-79 and 1980-84.
Margaret Trudeau (b. 1948), divorced wife of Pierre Trudeau
Justin Trudeau (b. 1971), current Prime Minister of Canada since 2015, son of Pierre
Sophie Grégoire Trudeau (b. 1975), wife of Justin Trudeau
Alexandre Trudeau (b. 1973), Canadian film-maker, son of Pierre and Margaret
Michel Trudeau (1975–1998), son of Pierre and Margaret who died in an avalanche
Arthur Trudeau (1902–1991), Lieutenant General in the United States Army
Catherine Trudeau (b. 1975), Quebec actress
Charles Trudeau (politician) (1743–1816), 5th mayor of New Orleans, Louisiana, U.S.
Colette Trudeau (b. 1985), Canadian born Métis singer/songwriter
Edward Livingston Trudeau (1848–1915), American physician
Garry Trudeau (b. 1948), American cartoonist of Doonesbury
Jack Trudeau (b. 1962), is a former professional American football player
John Trudeau (1927–2008), American musician
Kevin Trudeau (b. 1963), American author, convicted felon and infomercial salesman
Sophie Trudeau (musician), Canadian post-rock musician
Stephanie Trudeau (b. 1986), Miss USA beauty queen from St. Ignatius, Montana
Yves Trudeau (artist) (b. 1930), Quebec sculptor
Yves Trudeau (biker) (1946–2008), Quebec biker
Zénon Trudeau, Commandant Governor of Illinois between 1793 and 1799

See also

 
 Truteau (surname)
 

Surnames from given names
French-language surnames